Wang Ben (王賁), was a Chinese general of the state of Qin during the Warring States period. He was a son of the better known general Wang Jian. He played a key role in the Qin's wars of unification.

Life 
In 225 BCE, a 600,000 strong Qin army led by Wang Ben conquered more than ten cities on the northern border of Chu as a precautionary move to guard the flank from possible attacks from Chu while Qin was invading Wei. Wang Ben then led his forces north to attack and besiege Daliang, the capital of Wei. As Daliang was situated at the concourse of the Sui and Ying rivers and the Hong Canal, its geographical location gave it a natural defensive advantage. Besides, the moat around Daliang was very wide and all the five gates of the city had drawbridges, making it even more difficult for Qin forces to penetrate the city. The Wei troops used the opportunity to strengthen their fortifications and defences.

Wang Ben came up with the idea of directing the waters from the Yellow River and the Hong Canal to flood Daliang. Wang Ben's troops worked for three months to redirect the water flow while maintaining the siege on Daliang, and succeeded in their plan. Daliang was heavily flooded and over 100,000 people died, including civilians. King Jia of Wei surrendered and Wei came under Qin's control. Qin established the commanderies of Dang and Sishui in the former Wei territories.

In 222 BCE he led an army that invaded Liaodong and destroyed the remaining forces of Yan, capturing King Xin, and bringing an end to Yan. In the same year Wang Ben led a Qin army that conquered Dai, and captured King Jia of Dai (the last ruler of the state of Zhao).

Popular Culture
In Kingdom where he is known as "Ou Hon" son of Ou Sen, he is a master spearman and General of Qin, he has some arrogant attitude due to his high birth and his proficient skills. He also has a rivalry with Xin due to both of them being promising youngsters aiming to become Great Generals of the Heavens.

References

3rd-century BC Chinese military personnel
Generals from Shaanxi
Qin dynasty generals
Qin (state)
People from Weinan
Zhou dynasty generals